The following Confederate States Army units and commanders fought in the Siege of Vicksburg of the American Civil War. The Union order of battle is listed separately. Order of battle compiled from the army organization during the campaign.

Abbreviations used

Military Officer Rank
 Gen = General
 LTG = Lieutenant General
 MG = Major General
 BG = Brigadier General
 Col = Colonel
 Ltc = Lieutenant Colonel
 Maj = Major
 Cpt = Captain
 Lt = Lieutenant

Other
 w = wounded
 mw = mortally wounded
 k =killed

Department of Mississippi and East Louisiana

Army of Vicksburg

LTG John C. Pemberton, Commanding

Notes

References
U.S. War Department, The War of the Rebellion: a Compilation of the Official Records of the Union and Confederate Armies, U.S. Government Printing Office, 1880–1901.
Civil War Home: Organization of the Confederate Army at Vicksburg, May 19–July 4, 1863. -- The Siege of Vicksburg, Miss.
National Park Service: Vicksburg National Military Park (Siege of Vicksburg: Confederate order of battle).
National Park Service: Vicksburg National Military Park (Troops in the Campaign, Siege and Defense of Vicksburg).
National Park Service: Vicksburg National Military Park (Campaign, Siege and Defense of Vicksburg -- General summary of Casualties, March 29–July 4).

American Civil War orders of battle